Algeria has submitted films for the Academy Award for Best International Feature Film since 1969. The award is handed out annually by the United States Academy of Motion Picture Arts and Sciences to a feature-length motion picture produced outside the United States that contains primarily non-English dialogue. It was not created until the 1956 Academy Awards, in which a competitive Academy Award of Merit, known as the Best Foreign Language Film Award, was created for non-English speaking films, and has been given annually since.

, four Algerian films have been nominated for Academy Award for Best Foreign Language Film, and one of these films, Costa-Gavras' Z, has won the award. The other two directors to have Algerian films accepted as nominees are Ettore Scola and Rachid Bouchareb. Scola's Le Bal was accepted as a nominee at the 56th Academy Awards. Bouchareb has had three films nominated: Dust of Life at the 68th Academy Awards, Days of Glory at the 79th Academy Awards and Outside the Law at the 83rd Academy Awards.

Submissions
The Academy of Motion Picture Arts and Sciences has invited the film industries of various countries to submit their best film for the Academy Award for Best Foreign Language Film since 1956. The Foreign Language Film Award Committee oversees the process and reviews all the submitted films. Following this, they vote via secret ballot to determine the five nominees for the award. Below is a list of the films that have been submitted by Algeria for review by the Academy for the award by year and the respective Academy Awards ceremony.

A running theme in the Algerian submissions has been the relationship between Algeria (and its citizens) and its former colonial power, France. Salut Cousin! and Inch'Allah Dimanche follow the lives of recent Algerian immigrants in France, while Cheb follows a young man who returns to his native Algeria and many years studying in France. Three others take a historical look at relations; La Dernière image tells the story of a young French schoolteacher who arrives in a small town under the control of Vichy France at the start of World War II, while the Oscar-nominated Indigènes follows a cadre of Algerian soldiers who fight in the French army during the same war. Chronique des années de braise shows the beginning of Algeria's war of independence from France through the eyes of a peasant.

Four other films- dramas Sandstorm, Autumn: October in Algiers and Rachida, plus comedy Mascarades tell more contemporary tales of Algerian life.

Four other Algerian submissions actually had little direct connection with the country. Z had a Greek-French director, while Le Bal was directed by an Italian, and neither film took place in Algeria. Rachid Bouchareb's Dust of Life followed a group of Amerasian children living in a refugee camp near Vietnam, while Little Senegal took place among illegal immigrants from Africa living in New York City.

See also
List of Academy Award winners and nominees for Best Foreign Language Film
List of Academy Award-winning foreign language films

Notes

References

External links
The Official Academy Awards Database
The Motion Picture Credits Database
IMDb Academy Awards Page

Algeria

Academy Award